Andrea Barnó San Martín (born 4 January 1980 in Estella-Lizarra) is a former Spanish handball player, member of the Spanish women's national team.

She was part of the  Spanish team at the 2008 European Women's Handball Championship, where the Spanish team reached the final, after defeating Germany in the semifinal. She competed at the 2011 World Women's Handball Championship in Brazil, where the Spanish team placed third. She was also part of the Spanish team that won the bronze medal at the 2012 Summer Olympics.

References

1980 births
Living people
People from Estella Oriental
Handball players from Navarre
Spanish female handball players
Olympic medalists in handball
Olympic handball players of Spain
Handball players at the 2012 Summer Olympics
Olympic bronze medalists for Spain
Medalists at the 2012 Summer Olympics
21st-century Spanish women